is a passenger railway station in located in the city of  Wakayama, Wakayama Prefecture, Japan, operated by the private railway company Wakayama Electric Railway.

Lines
Kire Station is served by the Kishigawa Line, and is located 6.4 kilometers from the terminus of the line at Wakayama Station.

Station layout
The station consists of one side platform serving a single bi-directional track. There is no station building and the station is unattended.

Adjacent stations

History
Kire Station opened on February 15, 1916. The station building was demolished in 1998.

Passenger statistics

Surrounding Area
Sando Elementary School, Wakayama City
 Wakayama City Hall Nishiyama East Branch
Wakayama Shin-Ai Women's Junior College

See also
List of railway stations in Japan

References

External links
 
 Kire Station timetable

Railway stations in Japan opened in 1916
Railway stations in Wakayama Prefecture
Wakayama (city)